KILT may refer to:

 KILT-FM, a radio station (100.3 FM) licensed to Houston, Texas, United States
 KILT (AM), a radio station (610 AM) licensed to Houston, Texas, United States

See also
 kilt, a traditional Highland Scottish garment